Noël Drouin (7 July 1912 – 5 October 2001) was a Progressive Conservative party member of the House of Commons of Canada. Born in Saint-Maxime, Quebec, he was a manufacturer by career, and also served as mayor of Saint-Maxime.

He was first elected at the Dorchester riding in the 1958 general election. After serving his only federal term, the 24th Canadian Parliament, he was defeated in the 1962 election by Pierre-André Boutin of the Social Credit party.

External links
 

1912 births
2001 deaths
Members of the House of Commons of Canada from Quebec
Progressive Conservative Party of Canada MPs